is a passenger railway station located in the city of Ageo, Saitama, Japan, operated by the Saitama New Urban Transit Company.

Lines 

Station layout
This elevated station consists of two opposite side platforms serving two tracks, located on either side of the Tōhōku/Jōetsu Shinkansen lines.  The station building is located underneath the platforms.

Platforms

History
The station opened on 22 December 1983 with the opening of the line.

Passenger statistics
In fiscal 2016, the station was used by an average of 2623 passengers daily (boarding passengers only).

Surrounding area
Haraichi Housing Area
former Haraichi Town Hall
Haraichi Post Office

See also
List of railway stations in Japan

References

External links

 Station information 

Railway stations in Saitama Prefecture
Railway stations in Japan opened in 1983
Ageo, Saitama